Drew Jarvis is an Australian children's television presenter who has appeared on television programmes The Shak and Lab Rats Challenge. He married Lucy Flook in 2009.

Biography
Jarvis grew up in Rockhampton, Queensland and was interested in film technology and the entertainment industry. When Jarvis was in year 7, he and his friends recorded their own shows on cassette tapes and then give them to classmates. A year later he transferred to Glenmore State High School and started studying film and television also making short films in his spare time. In the 1990s Jarvis moved to the Gold Coast where he attended Griffith University where he studied for a Bachelor of Arts degree. After graduating he performed in many shows at the Gold Coast Arts Centre’s Comedy Clubhouse while also working as a street performer in Warner Bros. Movie World as characters such as The Penguin, Dr. Evil and Willy Wonka. In 2006 he received his first major hosting role as Curio for the Channel 9 children's show The Shak. He then went on to be in many other television programs such as Lab Rats Challenge, Hole In The Wall and Pyramid.

In 2014, Jarvis joined Network Ten's children's department as the producer of Toasted TV and in 2015 he joined as series producer of the twenty-third series of Totally Wild. In June 2018 he was appointed as the executive producer of children's television on the network.

Acting career

Awards

References

External links 
 

Living people
Australian male actors
Australian television presenters
Year of birth missing (living people)